Limpopo Blue Bulls (known as the Assupol Limpopo Blue Bulls for sponsorship reasons) are a South African rugby union team that are a sub-union of the Blue Bulls Rugby Union and are therefore represented by the Blue Bulls in the annual Currie Cup and Vodacom Cup tournaments. They play out of Polokwane at the Peter Mokaba Stadium and draw players from the entire Limpopo province in South Africa. Between 2013 and 2015, the Limpopo Blue Bulls played as a separate team in the Vodacom Cup competition. Despite their first team not participating in first class rugby since 2015, they still have youth teams that participate in competitions such as the Under-21 and Under-19 Provincial Championships and in the Craven Week and Grant Khomo Week tournaments. They also have a women's team who compete in the South African Rugby Women's First Division.

History

Far North (1968–1995)

In 1967, the Far North Rugby Union was formed. They were based in Pietersburg (now Polokwane) and participated in domestic South African competitions between 1968 and 1995, when the advent of professionalism in South African rugby union saw the number of provincial unions reduced to 14.

Vodacom Cup (2013–2015)

They played as an independent team in the Vodacom Cup, starting in the 2013 season.

They slightly improved in their second season in the competition, conceding nearly 200 points less in their seven matches.

The Limpopo Blue Bulls took a different approach in the build-up to the 2015 Vodacom Cup. In 2013 and 2014, they selected the best players from across the Limpopo province – excluding the players of the best club in the region, Noordelikes, who competed in the SARU Community Cup at the same time as the Vodacom Cup competition – for 2015, they decided to train in Pretoria and also employ the help of some club players from the  region, most notably Oostelike Eagles, who contributed 17 players to their 2015 training squad. They scored more than twice the number of points they scored in 2014 and conceded half the number of points.

Records

Limpopo Blue Bulls records:

Vodacom Cup

The Limpopo Blue Bulls' all-time record in the Vodacom Cup since their entry into the competition in 2013 is:

References

South African rugby union teams
Blue Bulls Rugby Union